Sir Walter Caine Hillier  KCMG CB (1849 – 9 November 1927) was a British diplomat, academic, author, Sinologist and Professor of Chinese at King's College London.

Early life
Walter Hillier was born in Hong Kong but educated in England, at Bedford School and at Blundell's School, Tiverton. His father was Charles Hillier, Chief Magistrate, Hong Kong, and British Consul at Bangkok and his mother, Elizabeth, daughter of missionary Walter Medhurst. He was the brother of Edward Guy Hillier, one of the most respected bankers at the Hongkong & Shanghai Bank and its long-term manager in Peking (1889-1924).

Diplomatic career
1867: Appointment to the Consular Service and service as an interpreter in China (followed by various promotions)
1879: Assistant Chinese Secretary in Peking (in 1883 accompanying Sir Harry Parkes to negotiate the treaty with Korea)
1885: Chinese Secretary
1889–1896: Consul-General in Seoul.

Later career
Hillier retired in October 1896 and, from February to April 1901, was attached to the Legation in Peking as special political officer for Chinese affairs with the rank of acting First Secretary in the Diplomatic Service. This involved his appointment as adviser to the military authorities in China at which time he was Mentioned in despatches.
A stone memorial was erected to Hillier and to a British military officer at Shan-hai-Kwan to recognise the protection afforded to Chinese during the times following the Boxer Rebellion.
From 1904–1908, Hillier was Professor of Chinese at King's College London.
From 1908–1910, Hillier served as an adviser to the Chinese government, in particular advising Li Hung-chan during his time as Viceroy of Zhili.

Selected works
 The Chinese Language and How to Learn It: A Manual for Beginners (1907)
 An English-Chinese Dictionary of Peking Colloquial (1910)
 Memorandum Upon an Alphabetical System for Writing Chinese: the Application of this System to the Typewriter and to the Linotype or other Typecasting and Composing Machines and its Application to the Braille System for the Blind (1927)

See also
 List of Ambassadors from the United Kingdom to Korea

Notes

References 
 "Death of Sir Walter Hillier," The Times (UK). 11 November 1927, p. 18.
 "The Late Sir Walter Hillier," The Times 17 November 1927, p. 16.

1849 births
1927 deaths
People educated at Blundell's School
People educated at Bedford School
British diplomats in East Asia
British expatriates in China
British expatriates in Hong Kong
British expatriates in Korea
Academics of King's College London
Linguists from the United Kingdom
British sinologists
Knights Commander of the Order of St Michael and St George
Companions of the Order of the Bath
Ambassadors of the United Kingdom to Korea